Oxford is an unincorporated community in southwest Worth County, Missouri, United States. 

Oxford is located on Missouri Route U approximately eight miles southwest of Grant City and five miles west of Worth. Parnell in adjacent Nodaway County is about four miles to the west. The Grand River flows past one mile west of the community.

Old variant names were "West Point" and "Rose Hill". A post office called Oxford was established in 1861, and remained in operation until 1905. The present name is taken from Oxford, England.

References

Unincorporated communities in Worth County, Missouri
Unincorporated communities in Missouri